Denis Kravchenko (April 17, 1976, Volgograd) is a Russian political figure and deputy of the 8th State Duma. He holds a Candidate of Sciences in Economics degree (2005)

From 1999 to 2001, he was the Deputy Chairman and, later, the Chairman of the Student Council of the Saint Petersburg City Administration. From July 2001 to March 2002, he was an assistant to the First Vice-president of St. Petersburg State Polytechnical University. In 2003, Kravchenko joined the United Russia. From 2011 to 2013, he worked as deputy to the Governor of Pskov Oblast Andrey Turchak. In 2016, he became the deputy of the 7th State Duma. In 2021, he was re-elected for the 8th State Duma from the Moscow Oblast constituency.

He is one of the members of the State Duma the United States Treasury sanctioned on 24 March 2022 in response to the 2022 Russian invasion of Ukraine.

References

1976 births
Living people
United Russia politicians
21st-century Russian politicians
Eighth convocation members of the State Duma (Russian Federation)
Seventh convocation members of the State Duma (Russian Federation)
Russian individuals subject to the U.S. Department of the Treasury sanctions